Kim Tae-young (born 8 November 1970) is a South Korean football manager and former player.

International career 
Kim played for the South Korean national team as a centre-back or left back, and was a participant in 1998 and 2002 FIFA World Cup. In the 2002 World Cup, he formed South Korea's defensive trio with Hong Myung-bo and Choi Jin-cheul, and contributed to South Korea's fourth-place finish. He was noted for his nose guard mask, which he wore after his nose was broken by Christian Vieri's arm in the round of 16 against Italy.

Managerial career 
He was the assistant coach to Hong Myung-bo for the South Korea national team during the 2014 FIFA World Cup.

Career statistics

Club

International

Results list South Korea's goal tally first.

Filmography

Television

Honours

Player 
Kookmin Bank
Korean Semi-professional Championship: 1993

Jeonnam Dragons
Korean FA Cup: 1997
Korean League Cup runner-up: 1997, 2000+
Asian Cup Winners' Cup runner-up: 1998–99

South Korea B
Summer Universiade silver medal: 1993

South Korea
FIFA World Cup fourth place: 2002
AFC Asian Cup third place: 2000
EAFF Championship: 2003

Individual
K League 1 Best XI: 2002, 2003
K League 30th Anniversary Best XI: 2013
AFC Opta Best XI of All Time (FIFA World Cup): 2020

Entertainer

See also
 List of men's footballers with 100 or more international caps

References

External links
 
 Kim Tae-young – National Team Stats at KFA 
 
 
 International Appearances & Goals

1970 births
Living people
Association football defenders
South Korean footballers
South Korea international footballers
Goyang KB Kookmin Bank FC players
Jeonnam Dragons players
K League 1 players
1998 FIFA World Cup players
2000 AFC Asian Cup players
2000 CONCACAF Gold Cup players
2001 FIFA Confederations Cup players
2002 FIFA World Cup players
2002 CONCACAF Gold Cup players
2004 AFC Asian Cup players
FIFA Century Club
Sportspeople from South Jeolla Province
Universiade medalists in football
Universiade silver medalists for South Korea